This is the list of awards and nominations received by MLB Network.

Sports Emmy Award

References

MLB Network
MLB